Matthew Croft (born 26 February 1973) is a former Australian rules footballer in the Australian Football League.

He had a long career with the Western Bulldogs before retiring in 2004. The balding Croft only received three senior appearances with the team in his final year, much to his dismay, as he was performing admirably in the VFL in defence with the Werribee Tigers. The Bulldogs agreed to allow him and fellow veteran Simon Garlick one final appearance in the Round 21 game against the Kangaroos, in which Croft booted 5 goals up forward, in a matchwinning performance.

References

External links
 
 

Western Bulldogs players
Werribee Football Club players
Australian rules footballers from Victoria (Australia)
1973 births
Living people